Le Piton Carré (3,197 m) is a summit in the French Pyrenees in the Massif du Vignemale, of which it constitutes the seventh highest peak.

Geography 
It is located in the Hautes-Pyrénées department, Midi-Pyrénées region, in the Pyrenees National Park, near Cauterets and Gavarnie.

Access 
The summit is attainable either by the vallée de Gaube beyond Cauterets, or by la vallée d'Ossoue.

References 

Mountains of the Pyrenees
Mountains of Hautes-Pyrénées
Pyrenean three-thousanders